The River Arnoia is a tributary of the río Miño in Galicia, northwest Spain. At 84.5 kilometers, it is the longest river in the province of Ourense. The Spanish wine denominación de origen protegida of Ribeiro DOP is located at the confluences of the valleys formed by the rivers Miño, Avia, and Arnoia.

Etymology 
The name territorio Arnogie (Arnogie territory) was first documented in 889 and fluvio Arnogie (Arnogie River) in 936. According to E. Bascuas, the toponym "Arnoia" would be derived from the Paleo-European base * Ar-n-, derived from the Indo-European root * er- 'flow, move', with hydronymic significance.

See also
 List of rivers of Spain
 Rivers of Galicia
 Galician wine
 Spanish wine

References

External links

Rivers of Spain
Rivers of Galicia (Spain)
Tributaries of the Minho (river)